The 2021–22 Milwaukee Bucks season was the 54th season of the franchise in the National Basketball Association (NBA). The Bucks entered the season as defending champions after winning the 2021 NBA Finals against the Phoenix Suns in the previous season in six games being the first team since the 2015–16 Cleveland Cavaliers to come back after trailing 2–0. 

On August 20, 2021, the NBA announced that the regular season for the league would begin October 19, 2021 and would return to the normal 82-game schedule for the first time since the 2018–19 season. The Bucks beat the Chicago Bulls in the first round in five games, but lost to the eventual Conference champion Boston Celtics in seven games in the Conference Semifinals, in their third playoff matchup in five seasons.

Draft picks

The Bucks had one second-round pick entering the draft.

Roster

Standings

Division

Conference

Game log

Preseason

|-style="background:#fcc;"
| 1
| October 5
| @ Memphis
| 
| Jordan Nwora (16)
| Lopez, Mamukelashvili (7)
| Connaughton, Nwora, Robinson, Mamukelashvili (3)
| FedExForumN/A
| 0–1
|-style="background:#fcc;"
| 2
| October 8
| @ Brooklyn
| 
| Jordan Nwora (30)
| Sandro Mamukelashvili (11)
| Tremont Waters (5)
| Barclays Center12,770
| 0–2
|-style="background:#cfc;"
| 3
| October 10
| Oklahoma City
|  
| Jordan Nwora (15)
| Giannis Antetokounmpo (9)
| Giannis Antetokounmpo (6)
| Fiserv Forum12,442
| 1–2
|-style="background:#fcc;"
| 4
| October 13
| @ Utah
|  
| Khris Middleton (25)
| Sandro Mamukelashvili (7)
| G. Antetokounmpo, Holiday (5)
| Vivint Arena16,016
| 1–3
|-style="background:#fcc;"
| 5
| October 15
| Dallas
|  
| Giannis Antetokounmpo (26)
| Giannis Antetokounmpo (10)
| Jrue Holiday (8)
| Fiserv Forum12,946
| 1–4

Regular season 

|-style="background:#cfc;"
| 1
| October 19
| Brooklyn
| 
| Giannis Antetokounmpo (32)
| Giannis Antetokounmpo (14)
| Giannis Antetokounmpo (7)
| Fiserv Forum17,341
| 1–0
|-style="background:#fcc;"
| 2
| October 21
| @ Miami
| 
| Giannis Antetokounmpo (15)
| Giannis Antetokounmpo (10)
| Middleton, Connaughton (4)
| FTX Arena19,600
| 1–1
|-style="background:#cfc;"
| 3
| October 23
| @ San Antonio
| 
| Khris Middleton (28)
| Giannis Antetokounmpo (8)
| Giannis Antetokounmpo (8)
| AT&T Center14,353
| 2–1
|-style="background:#cfc;"
| 4
| October 25
| @ Indiana
| 
| Giannis Antetokounmpo (30)
| Giannis Antetokounmpo (10)
| Giannis Antetokounmpo (9)
| Gainbridge Fieldhouse10,339
| 3–1
|-style="background:#fcc;"
| 5
| October 27
| Minnesota
| 
| Giannis Antetokounmpo (40)
| Giannis Antetokounmpo (16)
| Giannis Antetokounmpo (7)
| Fiserv Forum17,341
| 3–2
|-style="background:#fcc;"
| 6
| October 30
| San Antonio
| 
| Giannis Antetokounmpo (28)
| Giannis Antetokounmpo (13)
| Khris Middleton (5)
| Fiserv Forum17,341
| 3–3
|-style="background:#fcc;"
| 7
| October 31
| Utah
| 
| Giannis Antetokounmpo (25)
| Thanasis Antetokounmpo (9)
| Giannis Antetokounmpo (6)
| Fiserv Forum17,341
| 3–4

|-style="background:#cfc;"
| 8
| November 2
| @ Detroit
| 
| Giannis Antetokounmpo (28)
| G. Antetokounmpo, T. Antetokounmpo, Portis (8)
| Giannis Antetokounmpo (9)
| Little Caesars Arena9,254
| 4–4
|-style="background:#fcc;"
| 9
| November 5
| New York
| 
| Giannis Antetokounmpo (25)
| Giannis Antetokounmpo (7)
| Antetokounmpo, Hill (4)
| Fiserv Forum17,341
| 4–5
|-style="background:#fcc;"
| 10
| November 7
| @ Washington
| 
| Giannis Antetokounmpo (29)
| Giannis Antetokounmpo (18)
| Giannis Antetokounmpo (5)
| Capital One Arena15,570
| 4–6
|-style="background:#cfc;"
| 11
| November 9
| @ Philadelphia
| 
| Giannis Antetokounmpo (31)
| Giannis Antetokounmpo (16)
| Jrue Holiday (6)
| Wells Fargo Center20,029
| 5–6
|-style="background:#cfc;"
| 12
| November 10
| @ New York
| 
| Pat Connaughton (23)
| Giannis Antetokounmpo (15)
| Giannis Antetokounmpo (8)
| Madison Square Garden18,027
| 6–6
|-style="background:#fcc;"
| 13
| November 12
| @ Boston
| 
| Bobby Portis (22)
| Semi Ojeleye (7)
| Jrue Holiday (13)
| TD Garden19,156
| 6–7
|-style="background:#fcc;"
| 14
| November 14
| @ Atlanta
| 
| Giannis Antetokounmpo (26)
| Bobby Portis (8)
| Jrue Holiday (8)
| State Farm Arena16,901
| 6–8
|-style="background:#cfc;"
| 15
| November 17
| L. A. Lakers
| 
| Giannis Antetokounmpo (47)
| Antetokounmpo,  Hill (9)
| Jrue Holiday (8)
| Fiserv Forum17,341
| 7–8
|-style="background:#cfc;"
| 16
| November 19
| Oklahoma City
| 
| Giannis Antetokounmpo (21)
| Giannis Antetokounmpo (19)
| Giannis Antetokounmpo (7)
| Fiserv Forum17,341
| 8–8
|-style="background:#cfc;"
| 17
| November 20
| Orlando
| 
| Giannis Antetokounmpo (32)
| Giannis Antetokounmpo (20)
| Khris Middleton (8)
| Fiserv Forum17,341
| 9–8
|-style="background:#cfc;"
| 18
| November 22
| Orlando
| 
| Jrue Holiday (18)
| Bobby Portis (11)
| Giannis Antetokounmpo (9)
| Fiserv Forum17,341
| 10–8
|-style="background:#cfc;"
| 19
| November 24
| Detroit
| 
| Giannis Antetokounmpo (33)
| Bobby Portis (10)
| Jrue Holiday (6)
| Fiserv Forum17,341
| 11–8
|-style="background:#cfc;"
| 20
| November 26
| @ Denver
| 
| Giannis Antetokounmpo (24)
| Giannis Antetokounmpo (13)
| Antetokounmpo, Middleton (7)
| Ball Arena19,520
| 12–8
|-style="background:#cfc;"
| 21
| November 28
| @ Indiana
| 
| Giannis Antetokounmpo (26)
| Giannis Antetokounmpo (13)
| Jrue Holiday (9)
| Gainbridge Fieldhouse13,130
| 13–8

|-style="background:#cfc;"
| 22
| December 1
| Charlotte
| 
| Giannis Antetokounmpo (40)
| Giannis Antetokounmpo (12)
| Giannis Antetokounmpo (9)
| Fiserv Forum17,341
| 14–8
|-style="background:#fcc;"
| 23
| December 2
| @ Toronto
| 
| Jrue Holiday (26)
| Bobby Portis (11)
| Jrue Holiday (8)
| Scotiabank Arena19,800
| 14–9
|-style="background:#cfc;"
| 24
| December 4
| Miami
| 
| Pat Connaughton (23)
| Bobby Portis (16)
| Khris Middleton (9)
| Fiserv Forum17,341
| 15–9
|-style="background:#cfc;"
| 25
| December 6
| Cleveland
| 
| Giannis Antetokounmpo (27)
| Bobby Portis (16)
| Middleton, Holiday (8)
| Fiserv Forum17,341
| 16–9
|-style="background:#fcc;"
| 26
| December 8
| @ Miami
| 
| Jrue Holiday (27)
| Bobby Portis (8)
|Middleton, Holiday, Antetokounmpo (4)
| FTX Arena19,600
| 16–10
|-style="background:#cfc;"
| 27
| December 10
| @ Houston
| 
| Giannis Antetokounmpo (41)
| Giannis Antetokounmpo (17)
| Jrue Holiday (7)
| Toyota Center16,319
| 17–10
|-style="background:#cfc;"
| 28
| December 12
| @ New York
| 
| Khris Middleton (24)
| Antetokounmpo, Portis (10)
| Giannis Antetokounmpo (11)
| Madison Square Garden19,812
| 18–10
|-style="background:#fcc;"
| 29
| December 13
| @ Boston
| 
| Antetokounmpo, Holiday (20) 
| Pat Connaughton (9)
| Jrue Holiday (8)
| TD Garden19,156
| 18–11
|-style="background:#cfc;"
| 30
| December 15
| Indiana
| 
| Jrue Holiday (26)
| Bobby Portis (9)
| Jrue Holiday (14)
| Fiserv Forum17,341
| 19–11
|-style="background:#fcc;"
| 31
| December 17
| @ New Orleans
| 
| Jrue Holiday (40)
| Jordan Nwora (13)
| Jrue Holiday (5)
| Smoothie King Center15,504
| 19–12
|-style="background:#fcc;"
| 32
| December 18
| Cleveland
| 
| Jordan Nwora (28)
| DeMarcus Cousins (12)
| Nwora, Smart, Hill  (4)
| Fiserv Forum17,341
| 19–13
|-style="background:#cfc;"
| 33
| December 22
| Houston
| 
| Jrue Holiday (24)
| Jordan Nwora (9)
| Jrue Holiday (10)
| Fiserv Forum17,341
| 20–13
|-style="background:#cfc;"
| 34
| December 23
| @ Dallas
| 
| Khris Middleton (26)
| Connaughton,  Cousins, Nwora (8)
| Middleton, Holiday (7)
| American Airlines Center19,654
| 21–13
|-style="background:#cfc;"
| 35
| December 25
| Boston
| 
| Giannis Antetokounmpo (36)
| Giannis Antetokounmpo (12)
| Khris Middleton (7)
| Fiserv Forum17,341
| 22–13
|-style="background:#cfc;"
| 36
| December 28
| @ Orlando
| 
| Giannis Antetokounmpo (28)
| Bobby Portis (7)
| Jrue Holiday (10)
| Amway Center16,696
| 23–13
|-style="background:#cfc;"
| 37
| December 30
| @ Orlando
| 
| Giannis Antetokounmpo (33)
| Giannis Antetokounmpo (12)
| Jrue Holiday (7)
| Amway Center15,855
| 24–13

|-style="background:#cfc;"
| 38
| January 1
| New Orleans
| 
| Giannis Antetokounmpo (35)
| Giannis Antetokounmpo (16)
| Giannis Antetokounmpo (10)
| Fiserv Forum17,341
| 25–13
|-style="background:#fcc;"
| 39
| January 3
| Detroit
| 
| Giannis Antetokounmpo (31)
| Bobby Portis (14)
| Giannis Antetokounmpo (7)
| Fiserv Forum17,341
| 25–14
|-style="background:#fcc;"
| 40
| January 5
| Toronto
| 
| Khris Middleton (25)
| DeMarcus Cousins (10)
| Jrue Holiday (12)
| Fiserv Forum17,341
| 25–15
|-style="background:#cfc;"
| 41
| January 7
| @ Brooklyn
| 
| Giannis Antetokounmpo (31)
| Bobby Portis (12) 
| Giannis Antetokounmpo (9)
| Barclays Center17,732
| 26–15
|-style="background:#fcc;"
| 42
| January 8
| @ Charlotte
| 
| Giannis Antetokounmpo (43)
| Bobby Portis (13)
| Khris Middleton (9)
| Spectrum Center19,139
| 26–16
|-style="background:#fcc;"
| 43
| January 10
| @ Charlotte
| 
| Khris Middleton (27)
| Giannis Antetokounmpo (13)
| Khris Middleton (11)
| Spectrum Center14,253
| 26–17
|-style="background:#cfc;"
| 44
| January 13
| Golden State
| 
| Giannis Antetokounmpo (30)
| Giannis Antetokounmpo (12)
| Giannis Antetokounmpo (11)
| Fiserv Forum17,848
| 27–17
|-style="background:#fcc;"
| 45
| January 15
| Toronto
| 
| Giannis Antetokounmpo (30)
| Bobby Portis (11)
| Khris Middleton (5)
| Fiserv Forum17,341
| 27–18
|-style="background:#fcc;"
| 46
| January 17
| @ Atlanta
| 
| Khris Middleton (34)
| Bobby Portis (13)
| Giannis Antetokounmpo (6)
| State Farm Arena16,903
| 27–19
|-style="background:#cfc;"
| 47
| January 19
| Memphis
| 
| Giannis Antetokounmpo (33)
| Giannis Antetokounmpo (15)
| Antetokounmpo, Middleton (7)
| Fiserv Forum17,341
| 28–19
|-style="background:#cfc;"
| 48
| January 21
| Chicago
| 
| Giannis Antetokounmpo (30)
| Bobby Portis (13)
| Khris Middleton (6)
| Fiserv Forum18,013
| 29–19
|-style="background:#cfc;"
| 49
| January 22
| Sacramento
| 
| Khris Middleton (34)
| Bobby Portis (12)
| Khris Middleton (5)
| Fiserv Forum17,341
| 30–19
|-style="background:#fcc;"
| 50
| January 26
| @ Cleveland
| 
| Giannis Antetokounmpo (26)
| Giannis Antetokounmpo (9)
| Jrue Holiday (7)
| Rocket Mortgage FieldHouse18,904
| 30–20
|-style="background:#cfc;"
| 51
| January 28
| New York
| 
| Giannis Antetokounmpo (38)
| Giannis Antetokounmpo (13)
| Jrue Holiday (10)
| Fiserv Forum17,341
| 31–20
|-style="background:#fcc;"
| 52
| January 30
| Denver
| 
| Giannis Antetokounmpo (29)
| Giannis Antetokounmpo (9)
| Jrue Holiday (8)
| Fiserv Forum17,341
| 31–21

|-style="background:#cfc;"
| 53
| February 1
| Washington
| 
| Giannis Antetokounmpo (33)
| Giannis Antetokounmpo (15)
| Giannis Antetokounmpo (11)
| Fiserv Forum17,341
| 32–21
|-style="background:#cfc;"
| 54
| February 5
| @ Portland
| 
| Bobby Portis (30)
| Giannis Antetokounmpo (9)
| Middleton, Holiday (7)
| Moda Center19,393
| 33–21
|-style="background:#cfc;"
| 55
| February 6
| @ L. A. Clippers
| 
| Giannis Antetokounmpo (28)
| Bobby Portis (11)
| Jrue Holiday (13)
| Staples Center17,395
| 34–21
|-style="background:#cfc;"
| 56
| February 8
| @ L. A. Lakers
| 
| Giannis Antetokounmpo (44)
| Giannis Antetokounmpo (14)
| Jrue Holiday (10)
| Staples Center18,997
| 35–21
|-style="background:#fcc;"
| 57
| February 10
| @ Phoenix
| 
| Holiday, Middleton (21)
| Bobby Portis (9)
| Giannis Antetokounmpo (8)
| Footprint Center17,071
| 35–22
|-style="background:#fcc;"
| 58
| February 14
| Portland
| 
| Jrue Holiday (23)
| Khris Middleton (11)
| Khris Middleton (9)
| Fiserv Forum17,341
| 35–23
|-style="background:#cfc;"
| 59
| February 15
| Indiana
| 
| Giannis Antetokounmpo (50)
| Antetokounmpo, Portis (14)
| Holiday, Middleton (8)
| Fiserv Forum17,341
| 36–23
|-style="background:#fcc;"
| 60
| February 17
| Philadelphia
| 
| Giannis Antetokounmpo (32)
| Giannis Antetokounmpo (11)
| Giannis Antetokounmpo (9)
| Fiserv Forum17,341
| 36–24
|- style="background:#bcf;"
| ASG
| February 20
| Team LeBron @ Team Durant
| 
| Stephen Curry (50)
| Giannis Antetokounmpo (12)
| Trae Young (10)
| Rocket Mortgage FieldHouse0
| 1–0
|-style="background:#fcc;"
| 61
| February 26
| Brooklyn
| 
| Bobby Portis (30)
| Giannis Antetokounmpo (14)
| Holiday, Middleton (7) 
| Fiserv Forum17,341
| 36–25
|-style="background:#cfc;"
| 62
| February 28
| Charlotte
| 
| Giannis Antetokounmpo (26)
| Giannis Antetokounmpo (16)
| Jrue Holiday (8)
| Fiserv Forum17,341
| 37–25

|-style="background:#cfc;"
| 63
| March 2
| Miami
| 
| Giannis Antetokounmpo (28)
| Giannis Antetokounmpo (17)
| Jrue Holiday  (11)
| Fiserv Forum17,341
| 38–25
|-style="background:#cfc;"
| 64
| March 4
| @ Chicago
| 
| Giannis Antetokounmpo (34)
| Giannis Antetokounmpo (16)
| Khris Middleton (7)
| United Center21,259
| 39–25
|-style="background:#cfc;"
| 65
| March 6
| Phoenix
| 
| Khris Middleton (44)
| Giannis Antetokounmpo (13)
| Jrue Holiday (9)
| Fiserv Forum17,495
| 40–25
|-style="background:#cfc;"
| 66
| March 8
| @ Oklahoma City
| 
| Giannis Antetokounmpo (39)
| Bobby Portis (14)
| Khris Middleton (9)
| Paycom Center15,743
| 41–25
|-style="background:#cfc;"
| 67
| March 9
| Atlanta
| 
| Giannis Antetokounmpo (43)
| Bobby Portis (15)
| Holiday, Middleton (8)
| Fiserv Forum17,341
| 42–25
|-style="background:#fcc;"
| 68
| March 12
| @ Golden State
| 
| Giannis Antetokounmpo (31)
| Giannis Antetokounmpo (8)
| Jrue Holiday (7)
| Chase Center18,064
| 42–26
|-style="background:#cfc;"
| 69
| March 14
| @ Utah
| 
| Giannis Antetokounmpo (30)
| Giannis Antetokounmpo (15)
| Jrue Holiday (7)
| Vivint Arena18,306
| 43–26
|-style="background:#cfc"
| 70
| March 16
| @ Sacramento
| 
| Giannis Antetokounmpo (36)
| Giannis Antetokounmpo (10)
| Khris Middleton (8)
| Golden 1 Center15,864
| 44–26
|-style="background:#fcc;"
| 71
| March 19
| @ Minnesota
| 
| Connaughton, Lopez, Middleton (15)
| Bobby Portis (10)
| Carter, Holiday (7)
| Target Center17,136
| 44–27
|-style="background:#cfc"
| 72
| March 22
| Chicago
| 
| Jrue Holiday (27)
| Giannis Antetokounmpo (17)
| Jrue Holiday (7)
| Fiserv Forum17,983
| 45–27
|-style="background:#cfc;"
| 73
| March 24
| Washington
| 
| Jrue Holiday (24)
| Bobby Portis (12)
| Jrue Holiday (10)
| Fiserv Forum18,018
| 46–27
|-style="background:#fcc;"
| 74
| March 26
| @ Memphis
| 
| Giannis Antetokounmpo (30)
| Antetokounmpo, Portis (11)
| Khris Middleton (5)
| FedExForum17,794
| 46–28
|-style="background:#cfc;"
| 75
| March 29
| @ Philadelphia
| 
| Giannis Antetokounmpo (40)
| Giannis Antetokounmpo (14)
| Jrue Holiday (10)
| Wells Fargo Center21,467
| 47–28
|-style="background:#cfc"
| 76
| March 31
| @ Brooklyn
| 
| Giannis Antetokounmpo (44)
| Giannis Antetokounmpo (14)
| Giannis Antetokounmpo (6)
| Barclays Center17,917
| 48–28

|-style="background:#fcc;"
| 77
| April 1
| L. A. Clippers
| 
| Jordan Nwora (28)
| Serge Ibaka (10)
| Jevon Carter (8)
| Fiserv Forum18,023
| 48–29
|-style="background:#fcc;"
| 78
| April 3
| Dallas
| 
| Giannis Antetokounmpo (28)
| Giannis Antetokounmpo (10)
| Holiday, Middleton (9)
| Fiserv Forum17,902
| 48–30
|-style="background:#cfc;"
| 79
| April 5
| @ Chicago
| 
| Brook Lopez (28)
| Antetokounmpo, Portis (9) 
| Jrue Holiday (13)
| United Center20,799
| 49–30
|-style="background:#cfc;"
| 80
| April 7
| Boston
| 
| Antetokounmpo, Holiday (29)
| Giannis Antetokounmpo (11)
| Khris Middleton (9)
| Fiserv Forum18,046
| 50–30
|-style="background:#cfc;"
| 81
| April 8
| @ Detroit
| 
| Giannis Antetokounmpo (30)
| Bobby Portis (15)
| Jrue Holiday (9)
| Little Caesars Arena22,088
| 51–30
|-style="background:#fcc;"
| 82
| April 10
| @ Cleveland
| 
| Sandro Mamukelashvili (28)
| Sandro Mamukelashvili (13)
| Lindell Wigginton (8)
| Rocket Mortgage FieldHouse19,432
| 51–31

Playoffs 

|-style="background:#cfc;"
| 1
| April 17
| Chicago
| 
| Giannis Antetokounmpo (27)
| Giannis Antetokounmpo (16)
| Holiday, Middleton (6)
| Fiserv Forum17,717
| 1–0
|-style="background:#fcc;"
| 2
| April 20
| Chicago
| 
| Giannis Antetokounmpo (33)
| Giannis Antetokounmpo (18)
| Giannis Antetokounmpo (9)
| Fiserv Forum17,688
| 1–1
|-style="background:#cfc;"
| 3
| April 22
| @ Chicago
| 
| Grayson Allen (22)
| Bobby Portis (16)
| Giannis Antetokounmpo (9)
| United Center22,667
| 2-1
|-style="background:#cfc;"
| 4
| April 24
| @ Chicago
| 
| Giannis Antetokounmpo (32)
| Giannis Antetokounmpo (17)
| Antetokounmpo, Holiday (7)
| United Center22,020
| 3-1
|-style="background:#cfc;"
| 5
| April 27
| Chicago
| 
| Giannis Antetokounmpo (33)
| Bobby Portis (17)
| Jrue Holiday (9)
| Fiserv Forum17,506
| 4–1

|-style="background:#cfc;"
| 1
| May 1
| @ Boston
| 
| Jrue Holiday (25)
| Giannis Antetokounmpo (13)
| Giannis Antetokounmpo (12)
| TD Garden19,156
| 1–0
|-style="background:#fcc;"
| 2
| May 3
| @ Boston
| 
| Giannis Antetokounmpo (28)
| Giannis Antetokounmpo (9)
| Antetokounmpo, Holiday (7)
| TD Garden19,156
| 1–1
|-style="background:#cfc;"
| 3
| May 7
| Boston
| 
| Giannis Antetokounmpo (42)
| Giannis Antetokounmpo (12)
| Giannis Antetokounmpo (8)
| Fiserv Forum17,736
| 2–1
|-style="background:#fcc;"
| 4
| May 9
| Boston
| 
| Giannis Antetokounmpo (34)
| Giannis Antetokounmpo (18)
| Jrue Holiday (9)
| Fiserv Forum17,505
| 2–2
|-style="background:#cfc;"
| 5
| May 11
| @ Boston
| 
| Giannis Antetokounmpo (40)
| Bobby Portis (15)
| Jrue Holiday (8)
| TD Garden19,156
| 3–2
|-style="background:#fcc;"
| 6
| May 13
| Boston
| 
| Giannis Antetokounmpo (44)
| Giannis Antetokounmpo (20)
| Giannis Antetokounmpo (6)
| Fiserv Forum17,681
| 3–3
|-style="background:#fcc;"
| 7
| May 15
| @ Boston
| 
| Giannis Antetokounmpo (25)
| Giannis Antetokounmpo (20)
| Giannis Antetokounmpo (9)
| TD Garden19,156
| 3–4

Transactions

Trades

Free agency

Re-signed

Additions

Subtractions

Notes

References

Milwaukee Bucks seasons
Milwaukee Bucks
Milwaukee Bucks
Milwaukee Bucks